Blythe Auffarth (born April 23, 1985, in Pleasant Valley, New York) is an American actress, perhaps best known for starring in The Girl Next Door.

Filmography

TV filmography

Video game filmography

External links

  Official Website

American film actresses
1985 births
Living people
21st-century American actresses
American television actresses
American voice actresses
Actresses from New York (state)
People from Pleasant Valley, New York